Jesús María Albisu Andrade (born 6 April 1949 in Errenteria) is a former Spanish handball player who competed in the 1980 Summer Olympics.

In 1980 he finished fifth with the Spanish team in the Olympic tournament. He played all six matches and scored 27 goals.

References

1949 births
Living people
Spanish male handball players
Olympic handball players of Spain
Handball players at the 1980 Summer Olympics
People from Errenteria
Sportspeople from Gipuzkoa
Handball players from the Basque Country (autonomous community)